Hassan Bergaoui (born 3 October 1949) is a Tunisian hurdler. He competed in the men's 400 metres hurdles at the 1972 Summer Olympics.

References

1949 births
Living people
Athletes (track and field) at the 1972 Summer Olympics
Tunisian male hurdlers
Olympic athletes of Tunisia
Place of birth missing (living people)